Iowa Township is a township in Doniphan County, Kansas, USA.  As of the 2000 census, its population was 1,694.

Geography
According to the USGS, it contains six cemeteries: Fanning, Highland, Iola, Iowa Point, Martin and Olive Branch.

The streams of Cedar Creek, Coon Creek, Fox Creek, Mill Creek, Mission Creek, Pennell Creek, Squaw Creek, Striker Branch and Wolf River run through this township.

History
Iowa Township was organized in 1854. It was named for the Iowa people who lived there on the reservation.

References

 USGS Geographic Names Information System (GNIS)

External links
 US-Counties.com
 City-Data.com

Townships in Doniphan County, Kansas
Townships in Kansas
1854 establishments in Kansas Territory